Mike Connolly may refer to:

Mike Connolly (columnist) (1913–1966), American gossip columnist
Mike Connolly (ice hockey) (born 1989), Canadian ice hockey player
Mike Connolly (Iowa politician) (born 1945), Iowa state senator 
Mike Connolly (Massachusetts politician), Cambridge attorney and activist

See also
Michael Connolly (disambiguation)
Mike Conley (disambiguation)